Drue Tranquill (born August 15, 1995) is an American football linebacker who is a free agent. He played college football at Notre Dame.

Early years
Tranquill attended Carroll High School in Fort Wayne, Indiana. As a senior in 2013, Tranquill made 75 tackles, including 16 tackles for loss, to go with four sacks and an interception as a linebacker. He added 1,420 yards and 28 touchdowns on 114 carries on the ground as a running back, along with 16 receptions for 348 yards and five touchdowns. Tranquill was a four-star recruit coming out of high school, and received offers from several major programs, mostly in the Big Ten Conference. He verbally committed to Purdue University to play college football, but later decommitted and ultimately signed with the University of Notre Dame. Tranquill's younger brother, Justin, played safety for Western Michigan University,.

College career
Initially committed to Purdue University, Tranquill decommitted when he received an offer from Notre Dame.

As a true freshman at Notre Dame in 2014, Tranquill played in 11 games with three starts and recorded 33 tackles, a tackle for loss, an interception, a fumble recovery, and a blocked punt. He played in three games as a sophomore in 2015, with one start, but was lost for the season due to a torn ACL suffered while celebrating after breaking up a pass against Georgia Tech on September 19. He collected a medical redshirt for the 2015 season, and was able to play as a graduate student during the 2018 season as a result. As a junior in 2016, Tranquill started all 12 games for the Irish, tallying 79 tackles, two tackles for loss, and an interception. During Tranquill's senior year in 2017, he finished the year with 85 tackles, 10.5 tackles for loss, 1.5 sacks, three fumble recoveries, four passes defended, one interception and one forced fumble while starting all 13 games. At the end of the 2017 season, Tranquill announced that he would return for a 5th year as a graduate student in Mechanical Engineering for the 2018–19 season.

Awards and honors
Notre Dame Newcomer of the Year: Defense (2014)
First-team Academic All-American (2016) 
Wuerffel Trophy Finalist (2017)
Notre Dame Captain (2017 and 2018)
Wuerffel Trophy Winner (2018)
William V. Campbell Trophy Finalist (2018)
NFF National Scholar-Athlete (2018)

Professional career

Tranquill was drafted by the Los Angeles Chargers in the fourth round (130th overall) of the 2019 NFL Draft. He was named to the PFWA All-Rookie Team as a special teamer in 2019.

Tranquill entered 2020 as a starting middle linebacker. In Week 1, he suffered a broken ankle and was placed on injured reserve on September 15, 2020.

In the Wild Card Round of the 2022 season against the Jacksonville Jaguars, Tranquill intercepted a tipped pass from Trevor Lawrence.

References

External links
Notre Dame Fighting Irish bio

1995 births
Living people
Players of American football from Fort Wayne, Indiana
American football safeties
American football linebackers
Notre Dame Fighting Irish football players
Los Angeles Chargers players